Vadim Yurievich Stepantsov (born 9 September 1960) is a Russian poet and musician. Stepantsov is the founder of the Order of Courteous Mannerists and the musical group Bakhyt-Compot. He is also the author of texts for the groups Bravo, Na Na, and t.A.T.u.

Stepantsov is graduated with honors from Maxim Gorky Literature Institute.

Filmography 
1992 – For the Diamond Spray Jets
1994 – Music for December
1999 – Who should II forgive all
2000 – Editorial
2001 – Women's Happiness

Awards 
1996 – Ovationsongwriter

References

External links

 Вадим Степанцов на радио «Маяк»
 Елена Трофимова. Бурлеск, травестия, центонность куртуазных медитаций Вадима Степанцова «Дети Ра» 2008, № 5 (43)

1960 births
Living people
20th-century Russian male singers
20th-century Russian singers
Russian-language poets
20th-century Russian poets
21st-century Russian poets
21st-century male writers
Russian songwriters
20th-century Russian male writers
Maxim Gorky Literature Institute alumni